Cavalcante de' Cavalcanti (flourished c. 1250; died c. 1280) was a Florentine Epicurean philosopher and father of Guido Cavalcanti, a close friend of Dante Alighieri.

Cavalcanti was a wealthy member of the Guelph faction of Florentine aristocrats. He was a merchant banker who, with others, lent money under usurious conditions during the crusades with the consent and support of the papacy.  In 1257 Cavalcanti served as Podestà (chief magistrate) of the Umbrian city of Gubbio.  Following the 1260 victory of the Ghibellines over the Florentine Guelphs in the Battle of Montaperti, Cavalcanti went into exile in Lucca in Tuscany.  He returned from exile in 1266 and married his son Guido to the daughter of Farinata degli Uberti, a prominent Ghibelline.

Despite Cavalcanti's alignment with the papacy-supporting Guelphs, he was denounced as a heretic. It is possible that he was an atheist, like his son.

In lines 52-72 of the tenth canto of Dante's Inferno, the poet converses with Cavalcanti about his son, Guido, and depicts the dead father as a doting parent. Dante represents Cavalcanti and Farinata as neighbors in the same tomb in Hell, but without any interaction between them.

References
 
    

13th-century births
1280s deaths
Italian philosophers
Characters in the Divine Comedy